Liu Huixian (1912–1992) was a Chinese structural engineer and academician of the Chinese Academy of Sciences. He is famous for his contribution to earthquake engineering and is seen as "the father of earthquake engineering".

Liu graduated from Southwest Jiaotong University  (then Tangshan Jiaotong University) in 1933. He later received his master's degree from Cornell University and his doctorate from the University of Illinois. He taught in Zhejiang University and National Southwestern Associated University from 1938 until 1946. He married fellow scientist Hong Jing (洪晶), a physicist of the Harbin Institute of Technology, in 1941. In 1947, he went to the United States and taught in the Rensselaer Polytechnic Institute. In 1951, he returned to China and taught in Tsinghua University. In 1952, he joined the Jiusan Society and went to the Chinese Academy of Sciences. In 1978, he joined the Communist Party of China. He died in Harbin in 1992.

A statue of Liu was installed at Southwest Jiaotong University in 2013. There is also a prize for earthquake engineering named after Liu.

References

1912 births
1992 deaths
Chinese structural engineers
Cornell University alumni
Earthquake engineering
Members of the Chinese Academy of Sciences
Members of the Jiusan Society
Rensselaer Polytechnic Institute faculty
Southwest Jiaotong University alumni
Academic staff of Tsinghua University
University of Illinois alumni
Academic staff of Zhejiang University
Chinese expatriates in the United States